Filip Blecha (born 16 July 1997) is a Czech football player who plays for Zbrojovka Brno on loan from Slavia Praha.

Club career

Youth career

Career statistics

References

External links 
 Profile at FC Zbrojovka Brno official site
 Profile at FAČR official site
 Profile at Soccerway.com

1997 births
Living people
Czech footballers
Czech First League players
FC Zbrojovka Brno players
Association football goalkeepers
Czech National Football League players
Footballers from Prague